Badnera Assembly constituency is one of the 288 constituencies of Maharashtra Vidhan Sabha and one of the eight which are located in Amravati district.

It is a part of the Amravati (Lok Sabha constituency) along with five other Vidhan Sabha assembly constituencies, viz. Amravati, Teosa, Daryapur (SC), Melghat (ST) and Achalpur.

The remaining two Dhamangaon Railway and Morshi constituencies are part of the Wardha (Lok Sabha constituency) in the adjoining Wardha district.

As per orders of Delimitation of Parliamentary and Assembly constituencies Order, 2008, No. 37 Badnera Assembly constituency is composed of the following: 
1. Amravati Tehsil (Part), Revenue Circle – Amravati and Badnera, 2. Amravati (M.Corp.)–Ward No. 6 to 18, 32 to 40, 57 to 61, 72,73, 3. Bhatkuli Tehsil (Part), Revenue Circle – Bhatkuli and Nimbha. of the district.

Members of Legislative Assembly

See also
Badnera

Notes

Assembly constituencies of Maharashtra